AS Ayguesvives are a French Rugby league club based in Ayguesvives in the south western French region of Haute-Garonne. They currently compete in the 4th tier National Division 2 league, in the Aquitaine region.

History 

The club was originally set up as a youth side for boys and girls. From this the club now runs junior sides down to u9s as well as running senior sides for both men and women

See also 

National Division 2

References

External links 

 

French rugby league teams